A galactic algorithm is one that outperforms any other algorithm for problems that are sufficiently large, but where "sufficiently large" is so big that the algorithm is never used in practice.  Galactic algorithms were so named by Richard Lipton and Ken Regan, because they will never be used on any data sets on Earth.

Possible use cases 
Even if they are never used in practice, galactic algorithms may still contribute to computer science:
 An algorithm, even if impractical, may show new techniques that may eventually be used to create practical algorithms.
 Available computational power may catch up to the crossover point, so that a previously impractical algorithm becomes practical.
 An impractical algorithm can still demonstrate that conjectured bounds can be achieved, or that proposed bounds are wrong, and hence advance the theory of algorithms. As Lipton states:  Similarly, a hypothetical large but polynomial  algorithm for the Boolean satisfiability problem, although unusable in practice, would settle the P versus NP problem, considered the most important open problem in computer science and one of the Millennium Prize Problems.

Examples

Integer multiplication 
An example of a galactic algorithm is the fastest known way to multiply two numbers, which is based on a 1729-dimensional Fourier transform. It needs  bit operations, but as the constants hidden by the big O notation are large, it is never used in practice. However, it also shows why galactic algorithms may still be useful. The authors state: "we are hopeful that with further refinements, the algorithm might become practical for numbers with merely billions or trillions of digits."

Matrix multiplication 
The first improvement over brute-force matrix multiplication (which needs  multiplications) was the Strassen algorithm: a recursive algorithm that needs multiplications. This algorithm is not galactic and is used in practice. Further extensions of this, using sophisticated group theory, are the Coppersmith–Winograd algorithm and its slightly better successors, needing  multiplications. These are galactic – "We nevertheless stress that such improvements are only of theoretical interest, since the huge constants involved in the complexity of fast matrix multiplication usually make these algorithms impractical."

Communication channel capacity 
Claude Shannon showed a simple but impractical code that could reach the capacity of a communication channel.  It requires assigning a random code word to every possible -bit message, then decoding by finding the closest code word.  If  is chosen large enough, this beats any existing code and can get arbitrarily close to the capacity of the channel.  Unfortunately, any  big enough to beat existing codes is also completely impractical. These codes, though never used, inspired decades of research into more practical algorithms that today can achieve rates arbitrarily close to channel capacity.

Sub-graphs 
The problem of deciding whether a graph  contains  as a minor is NP-complete in general, but where  is fixed, it can be solved in polynomial time.

Cryptographic breaks 
For cryptographers, a cryptographic "break" is anything faster than a brute-force attack – i.e., performing one trial decryption for each possible key. In many cases, even though they are the best known methods,  they are still infeasible with current technology. One example is the best attack known against 128-bit AES, which takes only  operations.  Despite being impractical, theoretical breaks can sometimes provide insight into vulnerability patterns.

Traveling salesman problem 
For several decades, the best known approximation to the traveling salesman problem in a metric space was the very simple Christofides algorithm which produced a path at most 50% longer than the optimum. (Many other algorithms could usually do much better, but could not provably do so.)  In 2020, a newer and much more complex algorithm was discovered that can beat this by  percent. Although no one will ever switch to this algorithm for its very slight worst-case improvement, it is still considered important because "this minuscule improvement breaks through both a theoretical logjam and a psychological one".

Hutter search 
A single algorithm, "Hutter search", can solve any well-defined problem in an asymptotically optimal time, barring some caveats. It works by searching through all possible algorithms (by runtime), while simultaneously searching through all possible proofs (by length of proof), looking for a proof of correctness for each algorithm.  Since the proof of correctness is of finite size, it "only" adds a constant and does not affect the asymptotic runtime. However, this constant is so big that the algorithm is entirely impractical.  For example, if the shortest proof of correctness of a given algorithm is 1000 bits long, the search will examine at least 2999 other potential proofs first.

Optimization 
Simulated annealing, when used with a logarithmic cooling schedule, has been proven to find the global optimum of any optimization problem.  However, such a cooling schedule results in entirely impractical runtimes, and is never used.  However, knowing this ideal algorithm exists has led to practical variants that are able to find very good (though not provably optimal) solutions to complex optimization problems.

Minimum Spanning Trees 
However, the constant factor that is hidden by the Big O notation is huge enough to make the algorithm impractical.

References 

Mathematical notation
Asymptotic analysis
Analysis of algorithms